The 1914 Sheffield Attercliffe by-election was held on 28 December 1914.  The by-election was held due to the death of the incumbent Labour MP, Joseph Pointer.  It was won by the Labour candidate William Crawford Anderson, who was elected unopposed.

References

Sheffield Attercliffe by-election
Sheffield Attercliffe by-election
Sheffield Attercliffe by-election
By-elections to the Parliament of the United Kingdom in Sheffield constituencies
Unopposed by-elections to the Parliament of the United Kingdom (need citation)
20th century in Sheffield